KBEL-FM (96.7 FM, is a terrestrial American radio station broadcasting a country music format. Licensed to Idabel, Oklahoma, United States, the station is currently owned by Dave Smulyan through licensee KBEL Communications, LLC and features programming from Westwood One and the Oklahoma News Network.

History
KBEL-FM was originally a 1,000 watt mono FM station taking to the airwaves in 1976. Then after a short time at a minimum power, the station was granted authority to increase power to 3,000. The Idabel stations were originally sister stations of radio stations in Mount Pleasant, Texas which is about 85 miles south of Idabel, Oklahoma.

The station changed its call sign on December 12, 1990, from KWDG then a rock station to KBEL-FM to program country music. On June 22, 1999, then-owner Harold E. Cochran assigned the station's license, along with that of its sister station KBEL, to Box Broadcasting.

The licenses of both KBEL-FM and KBEL were assigned by Box Broadcasting to Rod Liechti's Brute Force Radio; the transaction was consummated on July 30, 2013. Brute Force Radio sold the stations to current owner Dave Smulyan of KBEL Communications, LLC effective October 9, 2018 for $230,000.

References

External links

BEL-FM
Country radio stations in the United States
Radio stations established in 1976
1976 establishments in Oklahoma